The 2000–01 All-Ireland Senior Club Hurling Championship (also known as the AIB Club Hurling Championship for sponsorship reasons) was the 31st staging of the All-Ireland Senior Hurling Championship, the Gaelic Athletic Association's premier club hurling tournament. The championship began on 1 October 2000 and ended on 16 April 2001.

Athenry were the defending champions.

On 16 April 2001, Athenry won the championship following a 3-24 to 2-19 defeat of Graigue-Ballycallan in the All-Ireland final. This was their third All-Ireland title overall and their second title in succession.

Graigue-Ballycallan's Adrian Ronan was the championship's top scorer with 4-27.

Team Summaries

Results

Ulster Senior Club Hurling Championship

First round

Quarter-final

Semi-final

Final

Leinster Senior Club Hurling Championship

First round

Quarter-finals

Semi-finals

Final

Munster Senior Club Hurling Championship

Quarter-finals

Semi-finals

Final

Ulster Senior Club Hurling Championship

Semi-finals

Final

All-Ireland Senior Club Hurling Championship

Quarter-final

Semi-final

Final

Scoring statistics

Overall

Single game

References

2000 in hurling
2001 in hurling
All-Ireland Senior Club Hurling Championship